"She" is a song recorded by Tommy James and the Shondells and released as a single in November 1969; it was also included on the band's 1970 album, Travelin'. The song reached #23 on The Billboard Hot 100 on January 24, 1970. The song also reached #15 in Canada.  It was the 13th and final Top 40 hit for the band, although James went on to have three more Top 40 hits as a solo artist.

Background
Early pressings of the 45 credited the writing to Tommy James, Mike Vale, and Robert King; at some point in the single's hit run this was amended to Tommy James, Mike Vale, Jeffry Katz, Jerry Kasenetz, and Ritchie Cordell, which is how it would be credited on Travelin' and on subsequent compilations.

Chart performance

References

1969 singles
Songs written by Tommy James
Tommy James and the Shondells songs
Roulette Records singles
1969 songs
Songs written by Ritchie Cordell